John Edward "Jeb" Burton IV (born August 6, 1992) is an American professional stock car racing driver. He competes full-time in the NASCAR Xfinity Series, driving the No. 27 Chevrolet Camaro for Jordan Anderson Racing. He is the son of Ward Burton, the nephew of Jeff Burton, and the cousin of Jeff's son Harrison Burton. He competed for several seasons as a regular driver at South Boston Speedway, an American racing circuit where his family is historically known for competing, as well as at Ace Speedway. Burton has raced in each of NASCAR's three national series.

Racing career

Early career
Jeb Burton started his professional racing career in the NASCAR-sanctioned Whelen All-American Series, in which drivers at local tracks compete for track championships as well as against drivers competing at other tracks for national titles, at South Boston Speedway shortly after his 16th birthday. He made his first start at the track, in the Limited Sportsman Series, in 2008, with his first full season of competition at the track coming in 2009; the 2009 season also saw Burton's best finish in the track's season-ending points standings, finishing 4th in the Limited Sportsman Series. Burton moved up to the track's Late Model Series in 2010, finishing 11th in the final standings, in addition to winning the track's Late Model Rookie of the Year award; he also competed in Late Models during the 2011 racing season.

In addition to competing at South Boston Speedway, where both his father and uncle made a name for themselves in their early racing careers, but where Burton, by his own admission, "struggled", Burton competed regularly at Ace Speedway, Orange County Speedway, and other racing circuits in the southern Virginia and central North Carolina areas, including at the "Daytona of Late Models", Martinsville Speedway. Burton's first Late Model win came at Ace Speedway in June 2011; he won a total of five races in Late Model competition over the course of the season at various tracks in the region.

Sports cars
In April 2009, Burton was selected as a "guest driver" to compete in the Sports Car Club of America's SCCA Pro Racing-sanctioned Volkswagen Jetta TDI Cup Series, competing on the road course at Virginia International Raceway. Burton's guest driver status left him ineligible for series points, or for winning any prize money in the event. Burton was able to qualify his vehicle, sponsored by State Water Heaters and the Ward Burton Wildlife Foundation, in the 9th position on the event's starting grid, but finished the race in 22nd; his run was marred by an on-track accident with another driver that knocked him out of competition.

ARCA and NASCAR

By 2011 Burton was considered to be a rising star in the world of stock car racing. In July of that year, Burton made his debut in big-league, touring-series stock car competition, driving the No. 6 Toyota Camry for Eddie Sharp Racing in the ARCA Racing Series' Hantz Group 200 at Berlin Raceway. Burton started 9th and finished 21st in the 200-lap,  event; he was involved in a multi-car accident on the opening lap of the race, but rallied to complete 120 of the race's 200 laps before being forced out of competition with suspension failure. Ward Burton stated that he was attempting to secure a sponsor for his son to compete in the full ARCA Racing Series season, however no deal was reached and it was the only ARCA event he would compete in during the year.

Later in the 2011 racing season, during competition in the Whelen All-American Series, Burton was briefly suspended by NASCAR, and was fined $250 USD, following an on-track incident in a heat race at South Boston Speedway. He was penalized for throwing a traffic cone at another competitor's vehicle following an accident; his father, also involved in the incident by entering the other driver's pit stall during the event, was placed on probation.

After the 2011 season, Burton desired to move up to full-time competition in a national series. In January 2012, it was announced that Burton would be competing for Hillman Racing in the NASCAR Camping World Truck Series during the 2012 racing season, sharing a ride in the No. 27 truck, a Chevrolet, with his father Ward. Due to his lack of experience on large tracks, Burton was ineligible to compete at Daytona International Speedway in the series' season-opening event; He made his debut in the series at Martinsville Speedway in the second race of the season; Trip Bruce served as the team's crew chief.

In his first series race at Martinsville Speedway, Burton, competing for Rookie of the Year in the series, finished 13th, on the lead lap. After the sixth race of the season at Dover International Speedway, however, Burton was forced to start skipping races due to a lack of sponsorship.

In September 2012, Burton debuted in the Rev-Oil Pro Cup Series, winning his first start in the series at Motor Mile Speedway.

2013–2014: Full-time in Trucks
On November 21, 2012, Turner Motorsports announced the signing of Burton to a two-year contract to run a full-time Camping World Truck Series schedule and a limited Nationwide Series schedule in 2013 and 2014. Turner also announced that Burton's father, Ward Burton, had been hired to assist with driver development.

In April 2013, Burton won his first Truck Series pole at Martinsville Speedway. On June 7, 2013, Burton won the WinStar World Casino 400K at Texas Motor Speedway, his first career NASCAR win. Later in the season he made his first career start in the NASCAR Canadian Tire Series at Canadian Tire Motorsport Park in September, and his Nationwide Series debut at Kentucky Speedway later in the month.

The 2013 season was a success for Burton, as he finished fifth in the overall Camping World Truck Series standings. He totaled 731 points to finish 73 points behind winner Matt Crafton and just one point out of fourth place. In 22 starts, he totaled one win, captured seven pole positions, and had five top 5s and 11 top 10s with only one DNF.

Before the start of the 2014 season, Turner Scott Motorsports announced that Burton's sponsor, Arrowhead Cigarettes, had defaulted on its payments, and that they had been forced to close the No. 4 team, leaving Burton without a ride. In early February Burton announced that he had signed with ThorSport Racing to compete in the season-opening Truck Series and ARCA Racing Series events at Daytona International Speedway, initially on a part-time basis, but on May 27, was increased to a full-time ride. For the 2014 season, Burton finished a disappointing eighth in the overall standings, with just two top-five and seven top-10 finishes.

2015: Full Cup season

In January, ThorSport Racing and sponsor Estes Express Lines announced that they were unable to come up with an extension to continue and the team shut down the No. 13 truck, leaving Burton without a ride. Later, however, he was signed by BK Racing to compete in the Sprint Cup Series to replace Cole Whitt, who had just left the team, in the No. 26 Toyota.

Burton drove full-time for the team in 2015 and compete for the series' Rookie of the Year Award. He failed to qualify for the Daytona 500 after a wreck during the first Budweiser Duel qualifying race. However, the next week Burton qualified 40th for his first Sprint Cup race, the Folds of Honor QuikTrip 500 at Atlanta Motor Speedway. He completed the race, finishing 35th. He had his best race to that point on March 29 when he finished 29th in the STP 500 at Martinsville Speedway.  However, Burton failed to qualify four times in the next six races, and crashed in his two starts in the No. 26 during this stretch, at Bristol and Kansas.  Estes would ultimately renew their sponsorship of Burton beginning at Richmond; when Burton failed to qualify there, he and Estes shifted to BK's No. 23, in place of regular driver J. J. Yeley.  After failing to qualify at Charlotte, Burton was able to qualify for the next eight races, before failing to qualify for the Brickyard 400.  Burton would fail to qualify again at the Bristol Night Race.  Before Darlington, BK Racing announced that he and Yeley would swap rides permanently, to give Burton a better shot of making races while Yeley would work to bring the No. 26 back up in the owner points (it was ranked 44th after 24 races).  Burton was able to qualify for his first seven races in the No. 23; this streak came to an end at Talladega, where Burton posted the No. 23's first-ever DNQ.  The next week, on the series' return at Martinsville, Burton would improve his career-best with a 27th-place finish. He would miss eight races during the season. Burton finished third in Rookie of the Year standings despite running the full season.  Despite initial reports that his contract was "multi-year", Burton did not return to BK Racing for 2016.

Burton returned to the Truck Series for the fall race at Texas, driving the No. 00 for JR Motorsports.

2016–2020: Part-time racing
Burton joined Richard Petty Motorsports to drive the No. 43 in the Xfinity Series. In June, sponsor J. Steicher and Co. defaulted on their agreement with RPM, and the No. 43 team suspended operations. Burton returned to the Cup Series for the Axalta "We Paint Winners" 400 at Pocono, driving for Go Fas Racing. In July, Burton and Estes Express Lines joined Biagi-DenBeste Racing to compete in the Xfinity Series at Indianapolis and Richmond, driving the No. 98.

On February 24, 2017, Burton and JGL Racing announced a multi-race agreement where Burton would drive JGL's No. 24. At the Daytona July race, he scored a fourth-place finish.

In 2018, Burton partnered with Richard Childress Racing for a part-time Xfinity schedule in the No. 3 car. In October, he made his return to the Truck and Cup Series at Martinsville, driving the No. 30 Toyota truck for On Point Motorsports and the No. 51 Chevrolet for Rick Ware Racing, respectively.

In 2019, Burton joined JR Motorsports on a limited Xfinity slate in the No. 8 Chevrolet. He also returned to Ware and the Cup Series for the STP 500 at Martinsville. In July, he signed with Niece Motorsports to compete in the Truck race at Kentucky. During the weekend of the 2019 Lilly Diabetes 250, Burton picked up a career-best finish with JR Motorsports, finishing 4th and delivering an emotional post-race interview. He remained with JRM and the No. 8 for the 2020 season, sharing the car with Dale Earnhardt Jr. and Daniel Hemric on an 11-race schedule, while also returning to Niece on a two-race slate in the Truck Series.

2021–present: Full-time in Xfinity
After a promising partial season in which he nearly won at Richmond Raceway, scoring a series-best second, it was announced on November 16, 2020 that Burton would compete full-time in the 2021 NASCAR Xfinity Series, driving the No. 10 Camaro for Kaulig Racing. He would win his first career Xfinity Series race at Talladega on April 24, 2021 after rain stopped the race with 23 laps left and NASCAR was unable to resume it.

On December 16, 2021, it was announced that Burton would drive full-time for Our Motorsports in their new third car, the No. 27 Chevrolet, in the Xfinity Series in 2022. He lost his ride with Kaulig Racing due to sponsor Nutrien Agricultural Solutions not returning in 2022, and Landon Cassill moved over from JD Motorsports with his Voyager cryptocurrency sponsorship to replace Burton in Kaulig's No. 10.

On June 23, 2022, Burton was involved in a big crash where Ricky Stenhouse Jr. hit him and his No. 27 inverted, landed on his roof, but he managed to get out of the car. On October 28, Burton announced he would be leaving Our Motorsports at the end of the 2022 season. He finished 16th in the final standings with no top tens.

On January 3, 2023, it was announced that Burton would join Jordan Anderson Racing full-time in the No. 27 Chevrolet, carrying his number from Our Motorsports, driving alongside rookie teammate Parker Retzlaff in 2023.

Personal life
One of three children of Ward and Tabitha, Jeb Burton is a native of Halifax County where he graduated from Halifax County High School in 2011. Like his father, aside from racing Jeb is an avid outdoorsman and hunter.
He married Brandi Nicole Newcomb on January 11, 2020.

Motorsports career results

NASCAR
(key) (Bold – Pole position awarded by qualifying time. Italics – Pole position earned by points standings or practice time. * – Most laps led.)

Monster Energy Cup Series

Daytona 500

Xfinity Series

Craftsman Truck Series

Canadian Tire Series

 Season still in progress
 Ineligible for series points

ARCA Racing Series
(key) (Bold – Pole position awarded by qualifying time. Italics – Pole position earned by points standings or practice time. * – Most laps led.)

References

External links

 
 
 Jeb Burton at Driver Database

Living people
1992 births
People from Halifax, Virginia
Racing drivers from Virginia
NASCAR drivers
CARS Tour drivers
Richard Childress Racing drivers
JR Motorsports drivers